The Civil Hospital, Hyderabad, also known as Liaquat University Hospital (LUH), is a 1450-bed tertiary care hospital in Hyderabad, Sindh. It is one of the largest teaching hospitals affiliated with Liaquat University of Medical and Health Sciences, Jamshoro, the first medical university of public sector in Pakistan. The hospital serves Sindh and the neighboring province of Balochistan.

History 
Civil Hospital, Hyderabad construction was completed with seven wards by 1894 at a cost of 88,173 rupees. 

A medical school had also subsequently started in the premises of the hospital. The medical school was upgraded to the status of a degree college, Sindh Medical College, in 1945. The medical college was later shifted to Karachi and renamed as Dow Medical College in order to avoid deregulation by University of Bombay. In place of it, Liaquat Medical College was started in 1951 in Civil Hospital which was later relocated to its new campus in Jamshoro. 

In 1963, another branch of the hospital in Jamshoro, Liaquat Medical College Hospital, designed by an Italian architect, was completed with 430 beds and started functioning as a teaching hospital.

Services 

Initially established in 1881 to provide basic health facilities, the hospital has 1450 beds across various departments.

The clinical departments include:

Department of Internal Medicine 
Paediatrics
Cardiology 
Pulmonology 
Dermatology 
Family Medicine 
Gastroenterology 
Nuclear Medicine
Nephrology
Psychiatry
General Surgery
Trauma & Orthopaedic Surgery
Accident & Emergency
Plastic Surgery
Paediartric Surgery 
NeuroSurgery
Obs & Gynae
Cardiothoracic surgery
Vascular Surgery
Urology and Radiology

References

Teaching hospitals in Pakistan
Hospitals in Hyderabad, Sindh
1881 establishments in British India